"I Got Love" is a song by American hip hop and R&B recording artist Nate Dogg. The song is the first single released from the studio album Music and Me (2001). The song was produced by Bink.

Charts

Weekly charts

References

2001 singles
Nate Dogg songs
Songs written by Nate Dogg
Songs written by Bink (record producer)
2001 songs